Hedingham Castle, in the village of Castle Hedingham, Essex, is arguably the best preserved Norman keep in England. The castle fortifications and outbuildings were built around 1100, and the keep around 1140. However, the keep is the only major medieval structure that has survived, albeit less two turrets. It is a Grade I listed building and a scheduled monument. The keep is open to the public.

Description
The manor of Hedingham was awarded to Aubrey de Vere I by William the Conqueror by 1086. The castle was constructed by the de Veres in the late 11th and early 12th centuries, and the keep in the 1130s and 1140s. To accommodate the existing castle, a large ditch was cut through a natural spur westward into the Colne Valley in order to form a ringwork and inner bailey; an outer bailey extended south further into the valley and what is now the modern village of Castle Hedingham. The stone keep is the only mediaeval structure to survive, and is in an excellent state of preservation.

The keep is nearly square, a common shape for Norman keeps. They are constructed from flint rubble bound with lime mortar, but, very unusually for an Essex castle, are faced with ashlar stone transported from a quarry in Barnack, Northamptonshire.

The keep has five floors including the Great or Banqueting Hall with a great fireplace and a central arch extending two stories. The top floor may have been added around the 15th century, replacing an impressive pyramid-shaped roof. This is a recent theory, however, and many older sources have noted the similar plans of Hedingham Castle and Rochester Castle, which was begun about 1126 and has four floors and four turrets.

 Changes were made in subsequent years, particularly during the Tudor period. Two of the original four corner turrets are missing. It seems likely, however, that their demise was an attempt to demolish the building for materials rather than a result of military action.  The outer buildings, including the hall, drawbridge and others, were replaced during the Tudor period. However, those structures have now also been lost. The only exception is the red-brick bridge of four spans that connects the inner bailey to the outer bailey, lying to the north-east of the keep. The bridge was built in the late 15th or early 16th century and has been restored several times. A chapel was previously located to the south of the stone keep within the inner bailey.

Around 1700, a Queen Anne style red-brick mansion was built in the outer bailey by Sir William Ashhurst, an MP and a former Lord Mayor of London. This was built sometime between his purchase of the property in 1693 and his death in 1719.

History
Hedingham Castle may occupy the site of an earlier castle believed to have been built in the late 11th or early 12th century by Aubrey de Vere I, a Norman baron. Hedingham was one of the largest manors among those acquired by Aubrey I. The Domesday Book records that he held the manor of Hedingham by 1086, and he ordered that vineyards be planted. It became the head of the Vere barony.

Aubrey II and Aubrey III are candidates for initiating the construction of a major stone tower at Hedingham, possibly to reflect the enhanced status of the family.  In 1133 Aubrey II, son and heir of the first Aubrey, was created master chamberlain of England by Henry I. In 1141, his son and heir Aubrey was granted an earldom by Empress Matilda. By that time he had been Count of Guines for several years by right of his wife's inheritance of that continental territory.

Matilda, wife of King Stephen, died at Castle Hedingham on 3 May 1152. The castle was besieged twice, in 1216 and 1217, during the dispute between King John, rebel barons, and the French prince. (In both cases the sieges were short and successful for those besieging the castle).

The castle was held by the de Vere family until 1625. Among the more famous earls are Robert de Vere, 3rd Earl of Oxford; Robert de Vere, 9th Earl of Oxford; John de Vere, 13th Earl of Oxford; and Edward de Vere, 17th Earl of Oxford, whom Oxfordians believe to be the writer of the works of William Shakespeare.

In 1713 the castle was purchased by Sir William Ashhurst; after his death in 1720, the estate passed to his great-granddaughter, Margaret Elizabeth Lindsay, the wife of Lewis Majendie. The Majendie family owned Hedingham Castle for 250 years until Miss Musette Majendie left it to her cousin, The Honourable Thomas Lindsay, descended from the de Veres through both maternal and paternal lines. His son Jason Lindsay and wife Demetra now live at Hedingham Castle with their children.

Present day use
While Hedingham Castle remains a family home, the Norman keep and grounds are open to the public from Easter to October. Educational school visits take place throughout the year. The castle grounds are a venue for jousting, archery, falconry, re-enactment battles, fairs, classic and vintage car shows, music concerts and theatre productions. The castle and associated buildings are used for ceremonies and parties.

The castle has been described as "the best preserved Norman keep in England."

Filming and photography
Hedingham Castle was the location for episode 2 of The Landscape of Man aired on Channel 4 in 2010 in which the castle grounds and gardens, which had been left to become a wilderness throughout the 20th century, were restored.

The castle has also been a location for the feature film The Reckoning (2003) and for the BBC series Ivanhoe (1997).

The documentaries Made in Britain (2005) with Fred Dibnah, The Shakespeare Theory (2013) with Derek Jacobi and A History of Britain with Simon Schama have used Hedingham Castle as a location.

The castle also appeared in a 1997 photo-shoot for Vanity Fair featuring Alexander McQueen and Isabella Blow; the photograph can be seen hanging in the National Portrait Gallery, London.

Notes

References

 Originally published in:

External links
 
 Entry in the Gatehouse Gazetteer containing a comprehensive bibliography

1066 establishments in England
Buildings and structures completed in the 12th century
Castles in Essex
Grade I listed buildings in Essex
Historic house museums in Essex
Gardens in Essex
Motte-and-bailey castles
Scheduled monuments in Essex